Ibrahim Kargbo Jr. (born 3 January 2000) is a professional footballer who plays as a striker for Slovenian PrvaLiga club Celje.

Born in Sierra Leone, Kargbo represented Belgium at youth international level.

Early life
Born in Sierra Leone, Kargbo moved to Belgium at the age of 8 with his father, Ibrahim Kargbo.

Club career
Kargbo played youth football for Beerschot, Reading and Crystal Palace, before signing for Roeselare of the Belgian First Division B in January 2018. He moved on loan to Lierse Kempenzonen in August 2019.

In December 2019, Kargbo signed for Ukrainian club Dynamo Kyiv. In August 2020, he moved on loan to Olimpik Donetsk. In January 2022, Kargbo was loaned to Slovenian PrvaLiga side Celje; however, his contract was terminated just one month later.

In August 2022, Kargbo was loaned to Cypriot club Doxa Katokopias. After half a season in Cyprus, where he made seven league appearances, he returned to Slovenia and signed with Celje on a permanent deal.

International career
Kargbo represented Belgium internationally at under-18 and under-19 levels.

Career statistics

References

2000 births
Living people
Sportspeople from Freetown
Belgian footballers
Belgium youth international footballers
Sierra Leonean footballers
Belgian people of Sierra Leonean descent
Sierra Leonean emigrants to Belgium
Association football forwards
Beerschot A.C. players
Reading F.C. players
Crystal Palace F.C. players
K.S.V. Roeselare players
Lierse Kempenzonen players
FC Dynamo Kyiv players
FC Olimpik Donetsk players
NK Celje players
Doxa Katokopias FC players
Challenger Pro League players
Belgian Third Division players
Ukrainian Premier League players
Cypriot First Division players
Belgian expatriate footballers
Expatriate footballers in Ukraine
Belgian expatriate sportspeople in Ukraine
Expatriate footballers in Slovenia
Belgian expatriate sportspeople in Slovenia
Expatriate footballers in Cyprus
Belgian expatriate sportspeople in Cyprus